Şehzade Mehmed Şerafeddin Efendi (19 May 1904 – 1966) was an Ottoman prince, the son of Şehzade Selim Süleyman and the grandson of Sultan Abdulmejid I.

Early life
Şehzade Mehmed Şerafeddin was born on 19 May 1904 in the Feriye Palace.  His father was Şehzade Selim Süleyman, son of Sultan Abdulmejid I and Serfiraz Hanım and his mother was Ayşe Tarzıter Hanım, an Abkhazia lady from the Barğan-Ipa family. He had one full sister, Emine Naciye Sultan, seven years elder than him, and an elder half-brother, Şehzade Mehmed Abdülhalim.

Education and career
Şerafeddin began his education in the Ihlamur Pavilion. His brother-in-law, Enver Pasha decided that the young princes should receive a military education, and for this purpose he had allocated the Ihlamur Pavilion as the Princes' School. It became compulsory for all princes below the age of fifteen to attend this school. Here besides their military training they were taught literature, history, religion, mathematics, and geometry.

Şerafeddin then attended the school created by the Empress Maria Theresa in Vienna in 1751, known as the Theresian Military Academy along with Şehzade Ömer Faruk, son of Abdulmejid II. Enver Pasha thought they should not be trained in the land of the waltz as "ballroom officers," but instead should proceed to Potsdam, where they would receive a Prussian education and become strong, reliable officers. So they were transferred from Vienna to Potsdam Military Academy in Prussia.

By 1918, he was serving in the Ottoman army as second lieutenant in the infantry.

Personal life
Şerafeddin had married two times and had one daughter. His first wife was Şükriye Sultan. She was the daughter of the crown prince Şehzade Yusuf Izzeddin and Leman Hanım. She was born on 24 February 1906 in her father's villa in Çamlıca. They married on 14 November 1923 in the Nişantaşı Villa. They divorced in 1927. She then married twice, and died on 1 April 1972.

His second wife was Semahet Hanım. She was born on 8 October 1911 in Beirut, Lebanon. They married in 1928. She gave birth to the couple's only daughter Bezmiâlem Mübeccel Sultan on 10 May 1929. They divorced in 1956. She died in 1973.

Exile and death
At the exile of the imperial family in March 1924, Şerafeddin and his family settled firstly in Paris, France until December 1924. They then went to Cairo, Egypt and finally settled in Beirut, Lebanon, where he died in 1966. He was buried in the cemetery of the Sulaymaniyya Takiyya, Damascus, Syria.

Honours

 Order of Osmanieh, 1st Class
 Order of Medjidie, 1st Class
 Liakat War Medal in Silver

Military appointments

Military ranks and appointments
  1918: Second Lieutenant in the Infantry, Ottoman Army

Issue
Şehzade Mehmed Şerafeddin had an only daughter:
 Bezmiâlem Mübeccel Sultan (10 May 1929 - 1 July 1993) - with Semahet Hanım. Born in Beirut, died in Istanbul, buried in Zincirlikuyu cemetery. She married Ihlan Baransel (1924 - 24 April 1997) in December 1954, Istanbul. She had a son: 
Sultanzade Cengiz Baransel (n. 1965). He married Shenay Küçük and had a son:
Kaan Baransel (n. 1994)

Ancestry

References

Sources

Ottoman princes
1904 births
1966 deaths
20th-century Ottoman royalty
Royalty from Istanbul